Radithor was a patent medicine that is a well-known example of radioactive quackery and specifically of excessively broad and pseudoscientific application of the principle of radiation hormesis. It consisted of triple distilled water containing at a minimum  each of the radium 226 and 228 isotopes.

The time of Radithor and radioactive elixirs ended in 1932, with the premature death of one of its most fervent users, Eben Byers, an American industrialist. This history has led to the strengthening of regulatory control of pharmaceutical and radioactive products.

History
Radithor was manufactured from 1918 to 1928 by the Bailey Radium Laboratories, Inc., of East Orange, New Jersey. The owner of the company and head of the laboratories was listed as William J. A. Bailey, a dropout from Harvard College, who was not a medical doctor. It was advertised as "A Cure for the Living Dead" as well as "Perpetual Sunshine". The expensive product was claimed to cure impotence, among other ills.

Eben Byers, a wealthy American socialite, athlete, industrialist and Yale College graduate, died from Radithor radium poisoning in 1932. Byers was buried in a lead-lined coffin; when exhumed in 1965 for study, his remains were still highly radioactive and measured at 225,000 becquerels. As a comparison, the roughly 0.0169 g of potassium-40 present in a typical human body produces approximately 4,400 becquerels.

Byers's death led to the strengthening of the Food and Drug Administration's powers and the demise of most radiation-based patent medicines. A Wall Street Journal article (1 Aug. 1990) describing the Byers incident was titled "The Radium Water Worked Fine Until His Jaw Came Off".

See also
Radium ore Revigator
Radioactive quackery

References

Radithor (ca. 1918). 15 Sep. 2004. Oak Ridge Associated Universities. 12 Apr. 2005 .

External links
Radithor at the Oak Ridge Associated Universities Health Physics Historical Instrumentation Museum Collection
Theodore Gray's Periodic Table of Elements
Promotional article in Deseret News, 26 Feb 1909

Patent medicines
Radioactive quackery
Radium
Products introduced in 1918